Near West Side or Near Westside can refer to:

Near West Side, Chicago
Near Westside Historic District
Near Westside, Syracuse

See also
Near East Side (disambiguation)
Near North Side (disambiguation)
Near South Side (disambiguation)
West Side (disambiguation)